The 2011–12 Minnesota Wild season was the 12th season for the National Hockey League (NHL) franchise that was established on June 25, 1997.

The Wild failed to qualify for the Stanley Cup playoffs for the fourth consecutive season.

Off-season
On June 17, 2011, the Wild officially introduced Mike Yeo as their new head coach. Yeo had been the head coach of the Wild's American Hockey League (AHL) affiliate, the Houston Aeros.

Regular season
Excluding 11 shootout-winning goals, the Wild scored 166 goals overall, the fewest in the NHL.

Playoffs
The Wild failed to qualify for the playoffs for the fourth consecutive year.

Standings

Schedule and results

Pre-season

Regular season

Player statistics

Skaters
Note: GP = Games played; G = Goals; A = Assists; Pts = Points; +/− = Plus/minus; PIM = Penalty minutes

Goaltenders
Note: GP = Games played; TOI = Time on ice (minutes); W = Wins; L = Losses; OT = Overtime losses; GA = Goals against; GAA= Goals against average; SA= Shots against; SV= Saves; Sv% = Save percentage; SO= Shutouts

†Denotes player spent time with another team before joining Wild. Stats reflect time with Wild only.
‡Traded mid-season. Stats reflect time with Wild only.

Awards and records

Awards

Records

Milestones

Transactions 
The Wild have been involved in the following transactions during the 2011–12 season.

Trades

Free agents signed

Free agents lost

Claimed via waivers

Lost via waivers

Player signings

Draft picks 
Minnesota's picks at the 2011 NHL Entry Draft in St. Paul, Minnesota.

See also 
 2011–12 NHL season

References

Minnesota Wild seasons
M
M